Richard Hajdu (born May 10, 1965) is a Canadian retired professional ice hockey right wing.  He was drafted in the second round, 34th overall, by the Buffalo Sabres in the 1983 NHL Entry Draft.

Hajdu played only five games in the National Hockey League, all with the Sabres, and was scoreless.

Post playing career
Born in Duncan, British Columbia, Hajdu currently works as a real estate agent in Duncan, and coaches a minor league hockey team there.

Career statistics

References

External links

Richard Hajdu Osborne Bay Realty

1965 births
Buffalo Sabres draft picks
Buffalo Sabres players
Canadian ice hockey right wingers
Dallas Freeze players
Flint Spirits players
Ice hockey people from British Columbia
Kamloops Junior Oilers players
Living people
People from Duncan, British Columbia
Rochester Americans players
Victoria Cougars (WHL) players